Adan Ali Adan Quinella (born 27 September 1988) is a Somalian footballer.

References 

Somalian footballers
1988 births
Living people
Al-Gharafa SC players
Al-Arabi SC (Qatar) players
Al-Wakrah SC players
Umm Salal SC players
Al-Markhiya SC players
Naturalised citizens of Qatar
Qatari people of Somali descent
Qatar Stars League players
Qatari Second Division players
Association football fullbacks